Xiaobo Qu is a Chinese civil engineer, traffic and transportation scientist. He has been a professor at the Department of Architecture and Civil Engineering of Chalmers University of Technology since March 2018. He is also leader of the research group Urban Mobility Systems in the Division of Geology and Geotechnics at the same university. He has been elected as a member of both the European Academy of Sciences and Academia Europaea in 2020.

Academic career
Prior to his professorial appointment at Chalmers University of Technology, he lectured at the University of Technology Sydney and Griffith University. He is an associate editor for IEEE Transactions on Cybernetics, ASCE Journal of Transportation Engineering, Part A: Systems, IEEE Intelligent Transportation Systems Magazine, ASCE-ASME Journal of Risk and Uncertainty in Engineering Systems, and Journal of Intelligent and Connected Vehicles, and guest editor for eight journals.

Xiaobo Qu's research focuses on integrating emerging technologies with urban mobility systems. Some results of his research have been practically implemented in freeway management, public transport operations, and intelligent vehicles. Xiaobo Qu has taught traffic and transport courses in Australia and Sweden. He has been invited to give keynote speeches at a number of conferences, and has been awarded Griffith Sciences Learning and Teaching Citations, Early Career Researcher Award, and Excellence of a Research Group Award in 2015.

References

Living people
Academic journal editors
Academic staff of the Chalmers University of Technology
Chinese civil engineers
Chinese expatriates in Australia
Chinese expatriates in Sweden
Academic staff of Griffith University
Transport engineers
Academic staff of the University of Technology Sydney
Year of birth missing (living people)